Cannabis in Honduras is illegal for possession, sale, transportation and cultivation.

References

Honduras
Politics of Honduras
Society of Honduras
Honduras
Honduras